Hesperocharis hirlanda, the Hirlanda white, is a butterfly in the family Pieridae. It is found in Colombia, Venezuela, Ecuador, Peru, Brazil and Bolivia. The habitat consists of forested foothills in the eastern Andes and lowlands in the upper Amazon basin. It is found at altitudes between about 400 and 1,000 meters.

Adults feed on mineralised moisture.

Subspecies
The following subspecies are recognised:
H. h. hirlanda (Brazil: Amazonas)
H. h. helvia (Latreille, [1813]) (Mexico)
H. h. fulvinota Butler, 1871 (Brazil: Rio de Janeiro)
H. h. apicalis Fruhstorfer, 1907 (Ecuador, Colombia)
H. h. niaguida Fruhstorfer, 1907 (Peru)
H. h. praeclara Fruhstorfer, 1907 (Brazil: Espírito Santo)
H. h. serda Fruhstorfer, 1907 (Colombia)
H. h. minturna (Fruhstorfer, 1910) (Venezuela)
H. h. planasia (Fruhstorfer, 1910) (Brazil: Mato Grosso)

References

Anthocharini
Butterflies described in 1790
Fauna of Brazil
Pieridae of South America
Taxa named by Caspar Stoll